Whatcha Lookin' 4 is an American Gospel music album released on April 30, 1996 by Kirk Franklin & the Family on GospoCentric Records.

Background
Whatcha Lookin' 4 is the third album released by Kirk Franklin and The Family. It also features backup by God's Property. The album was recorded about two years earlier in May 1994 but the release date has been delayed three times

All the songs on the album were written and produced by Franklin except "Anything 4 U" (produced by Buster & Shavoni) and "When I Think About Jesus", (Public domain, arrangement by Franklin).

Kirk Franklin & The Family: Kirk Franklin, Jeannette Johnson, Keisha Grandy, Terri Pace, Stephanie Glynn, Demetrice "De" Clinkscale, Dalon Collins, David Mann, Darrell Blair, Byron Cole, Jon "J.D." Drummond, Yolanda McDonald, Sheila "Mother" Brice, Tamela Mann, Theresa Young, Carrie "Mousey" Young Davis

Track listing

Certifications and Chart success

Whatcha Lookin' 4 was #1 on the Billboard Top Gospel Albums Chart and Top Contemporary Christian Chart in 1996. That same year the album reached #3 on the Top R&B/Hip-Hop Albums Chart and #23 on the Billboard 200 Chart.

Personnel
Kirk Franklin - Piano & Synths
Erick Morgan - Drums
Jerome Harmon - Hammond C-3 & Synths
Bobby Sparks - Grand Piano, Synths, Hammond Organ, Minimoog, Prophet 5
Jerome Allen - Bass
Anthony Thomas - Guitar
Charlie Paakkari - Audio Mixing
Eric Lewin - Audio Mixing
Malcolm Harper - Recording Engineer (tracks 1-12, 14-15)
Gordon Garrison - Assistant Recording Engineer (tracks 1-12, 14-15)
Eric Lewin - Assistant Recording Engineer (tracks 1-12, 14-15)

Awards

Awards Wins
Whatcha Lookin' 4 won the Grammy Award for Best Contemporary Soul Gospel Album in 1997.

Charts

Weekly charts

Year-end charts

References

Kirk Franklin albums
1996 live albums